Tutong may refer to:
Tutong District, Brunei
Tutong (town), the administrative town of the Tutong District
Tutong River, which flows through the Tutong District
Tutong people, the main ethnic group in the Tutong District
Tutong language, a Malayo-Polynesian language spoken by the Tutong
Bisaya language (Borneo), another Malayo-Polynesian language spoken by the Tutong, also sometimes known as the Tutong language
Tagalog scorched rice

he:טוטונג (מחוז)
fi:Tutong